Mammea veimauriensis is a species of flowering plant in the Calophyllaceae family. It is found only in Papua New Guinea.

References

veimauriensis
Vulnerable plants
Taxonomy articles created by Polbot